Li Feng (born 14 August 1965) is a Chinese sprinter. He competed in the men's 200 metres at the 1988 Summer Olympics.

References

External links
 

1965 births
Living people
Athletes (track and field) at the 1988 Summer Olympics
Chinese male sprinters
Olympic athletes of China
Place of birth missing (living people)
Asian Games medalists in athletics (track and field)
Asian Games gold medalists for China
Asian Games silver medalists for China
Athletes (track and field) at the 1986 Asian Games
Medalists at the 1986 Asian Games